Peloconus junodi is a species of beetle in the family Cerambycidae, and the only species in the genus Peloconus. It was described by Karl Jordan in 1906.

References

Pachystolini
Beetles described in 1906